John L. Tappin (died December 24, 1964) was the United States Ambassador to Libya from 1954 to 1958.  He was the first Ambassador after the legation was raised to Embassy status.

Biography
Tappin attended St Mark's School and graduated from Princeton College in 1928.  He died of a heart attack while vacationing in Aspen, Colorado.

Career
Tappin became assistant to the Under Secretary of Commerce in 1947. He was involved in the formation of the Economic Cooperation Administration from 1948 to 1952. Tappin was a special assistant to the Under Secretary of State for Administration. He retired after resigning his post as Ambassador to Libya in 1958.

References

Ambassadors of the United States to Libya
1964 deaths